The 2020 MLS Cup Playoffs (branded as the 2020 Audi MLS Cup Playoffs for sponsorship reasons) was the 25th edition of the MLS Cup Playoffs, the post-season championship of Major League Soccer (MLS), the top soccer league in the United States and Canada. The tournament culminated the 2020 MLS regular season. The playoffs began on November 20 and concluded with MLS Cup 2020 on December 12.

On October 29, the league announced that the final regular season standings and playoff qualification would be determined by points per game rather than by overall points. This was due to eight MLS clubs, all in the Western Conference, being unable to play all of their scheduled 23 regular season matches in time due to the COVID-19 pandemic. Seven postponed matches were cancelled altogether in order for the playoffs to be able to start on the scheduled date.

The 2020 regular season Supporters' Shield champions were the Philadelphia Union, who were eliminated in the first round by the New England Revolution.

Seattle Sounders FC were the defending MLS Cup champions, having won their second title in MLS Cup 2019. They were beaten by Columbus Crew SC 3–0 in the MLS Cup final. As a result, Columbus Crew SC earned their second MLS Cup title, and first since 2008.

Qualified teams

Eastern Conference
Columbus Crew SC
Inter Miami CF
Montreal Impact
Nashville SC
New England Revolution
New York City FC
New York Red Bulls
Orlando City SC
Philadelphia Union
Toronto FC

Western Conference
Colorado Rapids
FC Dallas
Los Angeles FC
Minnesota United FC
Portland Timbers
San Jose Earthquakes
Seattle Sounders FC
Sporting Kansas City

Conference standings
The top ten teams in the Eastern Conference and the top eight teams in the Western Conference advanced to the MLS Cup Playoffs, with the teams ranked seventh to tenth in the East going through an initial play-in round. Background colors denote playoff teams, with green also qualifying for the 2021 CONCACAF Champions League, and blue also qualifying for the 2021 Leagues Cup. The Portland Timbers and non-playoff Atlanta United FC qualified for the 2021 CONCACAF Champions League as winners of the MLS is Back Tournament and 2019 U.S. Open Cup, respectively. Toronto FC qualified after being nominated by Canada Soccer by virtue of being the MLS finalists of the 2020 Canadian Championship.

Eastern Conference

Western Conference

Play-in round
This round was only applied to the Eastern Conference. The seventh-placed team, Nashville SC, played the tenth-placed team, Inter Miami CF, while the eighth-placed team, the New England Revolution, faced the ninth-placed team, the Montreal Impact. The lowest-ranked team to advance from this round, the New England Revolution, advanced to play the conference's first-placed team, the Philadelphia Union. The highest-ranked remaining team, Nashville SC, advanced to face the conference's second-placed team, Toronto FC.

Playoffs proper bracket

First round
The top four teams in each conference hosted the first round matches.

Eastern Conference

Western Conference

Conference Semifinals
The higher-seeded teams in each match-up hosted the tie.

Eastern Conference

Western Conference

Conference Finals
The higher-seeded teams in each conference hosted the matches.

Eastern Conference

Western Conference

MLS Cup 2020

As the highest-ranked team remaining in the overall table, Columbus Crew SC hosted the match.

Top goalscorers
There were 50 goals scored in 17 matches, for an average of 2.94 goals per match.

Notes

References

2020 Major League Soccer season
MLS Cup Playoffs
MLS Cup Playoffs
MLS Cup Playoffs